Slevin  may refer to:
 Slevin Kelevra, a character in the 2006 film Lucky Number Slevin
 Ciarán Slevin (born 1986), Irish hurler
 Gerard Slevin (1919–1997), Chief Herald of Ireland
 Jimi Slevin and the Electric Band, an Irish band with drummer Robbie Brennan
 Joseph Richard Slevin (1881–1957), American herpetologist
 Louis S. Slevin (1878–1945), photographer on the Monterey Peninsula
 Noel Slevin, Irish journalist 
 Ronnie Slevin (born 1941), retired Irish sportsperson
 Ted Slevin (1927–1998), English rugby league footballer who played in the 1940s, 1950s and 1960s

See also
 Slevini (disambiguation)